is a town located in Tagata District, Shizuoka Prefecture, Japan. ,  the town had an estimated population of 37,782 in 16,401 households  and a population density of 580 persons per km².

Geography
Kannami is located in an inland area in far eastern Shizuoka Prefecture, and the "root" of the Izu Peninsula, and in the southern foothills of the Hakone Mountains and the Tanzawa Mountains. The Kano River passes through the town.

Neighboring municipalities
Shizuoka Prefecture
Mishima
Atami
Numazu
Izunokuni
Kanagawa Prefecture
Hakone
Yugawara

Demographics
Per Japanese census data, the population of Kannami has been increasing over the past 50 years.

Climate
The city has a climate characterized by hot and humid summers, and relatively mild winters (Köppen climate classification Cfa).  The average annual temperature in Kannami is 14.4 °C. The average annual rainfall is 1999 mm with September as the wettest month. The temperatures are highest on average in August, at around 25.2 °C, and lowest in January, at around 4.4 °C.

History
During the Edo period, all of Izu Province was tenryō territory under direct control of the Tokugawa shogunate. During the cadastral reform of the early Meiji period in 1889, the village of Kannami was created within Tagata District, Shizuoka Prefecture. On April 1, 1962, it was elevated to town status.

Economy
The economy of Kannami is primarily based on agriculture. Major products include strawberries, cucumbers and dairy products. The town is also a bedroom community for neighboring Mishima.

Education
Kannami has five public elementary schools and two public middle schools operated by the town government. The town has one public high school operated by the Shizuoka Prefectural Board of Education.

Transportation

Railway
 Central Japan Railway Company -  Tōkaidō Main Line

  Izuhakone Railway  Sunzu Line

Highway
  Izu-Jūkan Expressway
 Izu Chuodo

Sister city relations
 – Kerman, California, United States – since October 12, 1985

Notable people from Kannami
Atsuto Uchida – professional soccer player

References

External links
Kannami official website (Japanese)

Towns in Shizuoka Prefecture
Kannami, Shizuoka